The Istanbul Justice Palace is a courthouse in the Şişli district of Istanbul, Turkey. It was built by the VARYAP construction subsidiary of the Varlıbaş Group.

Incident

On 31 March 2015, 2 suspected members of the Revolutionary People's Liberation Party-Front (DHKP-C) took prosecutor Mehmet Selim Kiraz hostage on the sixth floor of the Justice Palace. They demanded that the police announce the names of four members of the security services who they said were connected to the death of Berkin Elvan. The police negotiated with the gunmen for six hours, but eventually stormed the courthouse "because of gunshots heard from inside the prosecutor's office". The two gunmen died during the operation, while the prosecutor was badly wounded and later died of his injuries.

References

Buildings and structures in Istanbul
Courthouses in Turkey
2011 establishments in Turkey
Şişli
Government buildings completed in 2011
Palaces
21st-century architecture in Turkey